Sushila Devi Bansal College of Technology (SDBCT or S.D. Bansal) is a private engineering and management institute in Indore, India mainly offering graduate and post-graduate courses in engineering and management programmes. the college is approved by AICTE and affiliated to RGPV, Bhopal and DAVV, Indore. It is an institute of the Bansal Group. It was established in 2005.

Departments
Sushila Devi Bansal College of Technology has six departments: 
 Computer Science and Engineering
 Electronics and Communications
 Information Technology
 Mechanical Engineering
 Civil Engineering
 Master of Business Administration

External links

Jain universities and colleges
Science and technology in Indore
Universities and colleges in Indore
Engineering colleges in Madhya Pradesh